Achyuta Deva Raya (died 1542 CE) was a ruler of a Vijayanagara Empire of South India. He was the younger brother of Krishna Deva Raya, whom he succeeded in 1529.

During his reign, Fernao Nuniz a Portuguese traveller, chronicler and horse trader visited India  and spent three years in Vijayanagara.

Achyutaraya patronised Kannada poet Chatu Vittalanatha, the great composer and singer Purandaradasa (The Fathers of Carnatic music), and the Sanskrit scholar Rajanatha Dindima II. Upon his death, the succession was disputed. His son Venkata I succeeded him but ruled for a very short period and was killed in a chaotic succession dispute in which many claimants to the throne were killed. The dispute ended when his nephew, (younger brother's son) Sadasiva Raya, finally became king while yet a child, under the regency of Rama Raya, a son-in-law of Krishnadevaraya. His wife's name was probably Vasudha Devi. Sadasiva Raya was probably son of Vasudha Devi's sister Hemavati and her husband Ranga Raya.

Reign

The time when Achyuta Deva Raya became the king was by no means a favorable one. The peace and prosperity of the halcyon days under Krishnadevaraya were coming to an end. Feudatories and enemies were waiting for an opportunity to bring down the empire. In addition, Achyuta Deva Raya had to contend with the powerful Rama Raya, who was competing for the throne.

While the works of Nuniz speak very lowly of Achyuta Deva Raya as being a king given to vices and cruelty, there is enough evidence to prove that the king was indeed noteworthy in his own right and fought hard to keep the prosperity of the kingdom alive. He had been handpicked by Krishna Deva Raya himself as an able successor.

Ismail Adil Shah of Bijapur invaded and captured the Raichur doab. However the Gajapati's of Orissa and Quli Qutub Shah of Golconda were defeated and pushed back. Now Achyuta Deva Raya along with his general Salakaraju Tirumala went on a southern campaign to bring the chiefs of Travancore and Ummatur under control. This they did successfully. Then they invaded the doab north of Tungabhadra and recaptured the forts of Raichur and Mudgal.

The two Sanskrit works Achyutabhyudayam and Varadambikaparinayam describe the king's life and rule in detail.

Throughout his rule, Achyuta Deva Raya had to contend with the manipulations of Rama Raya who in his powerful capacity had replaced many of the faithful servants of the Kingdom in high ranking positions with men of his own favour. On more than one occasion the Bahamani Sultans were brought in to play the role of mediator between the king and Ailya Rama Raya in the game of power sharing. This would further weaken the kingdom. Around 1540 
Rama Raya imprisoned Achyuta Deva Raya in a coup.

In 1542 Achyuta Deva Raya died, and was succeeded by his young son of Venkata I (Venkata Raya or Venkatadri Raya). But he was soon killed, and Sadasiva Raya became the new king. Rama Raya became the regent and let very little governance in the hands of Sadasiva Raya.

The Tiruvengalanatha temple was built at Vijayanagara during his reign. It has become popularly known by his name as Achyutaraya temple, rather than by the name of the deity Lord Venkateshwara to whom the temple was dedicated.

References

 Prof K.A. Nilakanta Sastri, History of South India, From Prehistoric times to fall of Vijayanagar, 1955, OUP, New Delhi (Reprinted 2002)

External links

 Coins
 Pictures of temple on HampiOnline.com
 Achyuta Rayas Temple Photographs, 2013
 Learn more about Achyutaraya Temple on HampiOnline.com

1529 births
1529 in India
1542 deaths
1542 in India
16th-century Indian monarchs
Hindu monarchs
Indian Hindus
People of the Vijayanagara Empire
Tulu people